Mboungou is a Congolese surname. Notable people with the surname include:

 Joseph Kignoumbi Kia Mboungou, Congolese politician
 Prestige Mboungou (born 2000), Congolese footballer

Kongo-language surnames
Surnames of Congolese origin